Babiyachaur refers to the following places in Nepal:

 Babiyachaur, Myagdi
 Babiyachaur, Surkhet